Raimo Kuuluvainen (23 April 1955 – 29 March 1999) was a Finnish footballer. He competed in the men's tournament at the 1980 Summer Olympics.

References

External links
 

1955 births
1999 deaths
Finnish footballers
Finland international footballers
Olympic footballers of Finland
Footballers at the 1980 Summer Olympics
People from Hollola
Association football midfielders
Sportspeople from Päijät-Häme
FC Ilves players
Kuopion Palloseura players